Quasdorf Blacksmith and Wagon Shop, now known as the Quasdorf Blacksmith and Wagon Museum, is a historic building located in Dows, Iowa, United States.  The shop was built in 1899 and remained in continuous use until 1990 when Frank Quasdorf willed the building to the Dows Historical Society.  The building was restored and reopened as a museum.  Displays include machines, tools, belt-driven and electric welding equipment, original wagon wheels, blacksmithing items, a forge and the bellows. Many of the items on display are original to the building and the Quasdorf family.

References

Commercial buildings completed in 1899
Romanesque Revival architecture in Iowa
Buildings and structures in Wright County, Iowa
Commercial buildings on the National Register of Historic Places in Iowa
Museums in Wright County, Iowa
History museums in Iowa
Transportation museums in Iowa
Blacksmith shops
1899 establishments in Iowa
National Register of Historic Places in Wright County, Iowa